"Episode 1" is the first episode of the second series of Fleabag, and the seventh overall. The episode was written by Phoebe Waller-Bridge and directed by Harry Bradbeer. It premiered on Amazon Prime Video on 17 May 2019 along with the rest of the series.

The episode takes place during an engagement dinner for Fleabag's dad and Godmother, picking up one year after the finale of series one. Fleabag is introduced to the Priest who will officiate the wedding. After her sister, Claire, has a miscarriage in the restaurant bathroom, Fleabag tells the dinner guests that the miscarriage was her own in an attempt to help conceal it. She hits Claire's husband in the face and gets a bloody nose after he shoves her.

The episode was hailed by critics as a "cinematic comedy masterpiece" and received three 2019 Primetime Emmy Awards, for Outstanding Directing for a Comedy Series, Outstanding Writing for a Comedy Series, and Outstanding Lead Actress in a Comedy Series.

Plot 
In medias res, Fleabag (Phoebe Waller-Bridge) is in a "chic" public restroom cleaning blood from her nose. She breaks the fourth wall to state, "This is a love story." There is an interstitial scene where Fleabag explains steps she has taken to get her life together in the year since the end of series one. She is then shown at a restaurant with her family, including her sister, Claire (Sian Clifford), to whom she has not spoken for a year. Her father (Bill Paterson) and her godmother (Olivia Colman) are hosting the dinner to celebrate their engagement. The priest (Andrew Scott) who will officiate their wedding is also in attendance. Claire and her husband Martin (Brett Gelman), announce that they are trying to get pregnant, and that they are no longer drinking because Martin is a recovering alcoholic.

When Fleabag goes outside to smoke a cigarette, The Priest tries to speak to her, but she silently walks away mid-sentence. He insults her as she goes, to which Fleabag responds with silent delight.

Fleabag's godmother, who is an artist, tells the table that her gift to Fleabag's father is a portrait of Fleabag and Claire, for which they will need to sit.

When Fleabag is outside smoking another cigarette, her father comes to speak to her. He hands her an envelope as a belated birthday gift, which she doesn't read. Upon walking into the restaurant, Fleabag catches Martin drinking alcohol away from the table.

At the table, Claire discusses her new position in Finland at her company, where she works in finance. Her family reacts with surprise because they all thought she was a lawyer. Claire asks Fleabag to open the gift, and Fleabag reads aloud that it is a gift certificate for a therapy session.

Later, Fleabag goes into the bathroom to find Claire, who shares that she has just had a miscarriage. Fleabag offers to help and Claire responds angrily. Fleabag insists that they go to the hospital and Claire agrees. They make a plan to excuse themselves from dinner, but after sitting back down Claire refuses to leave. When the other dinner guests ask what's wrong, Fleabag lies and says she just had a miscarriage. Fleabag readies herself to leave after she and Claire have a veiled argument about Claire's refusal to acknowledge the miscarriage. Martin taunts Fleabag, who punches him in the nose. As she bends to punch him again, he shoves her face away. As the waitress (Maddie Rice) approaches to help, Martin accidentally elbows her in the nose.

Fleabag is now in the bathroom, cleaning her bloody nose, in the same position as the opening scene. The Priest knocks on the door to ask if she needs help. She offers a clean towel to the waitress, who is sitting on the floor. As she is leaving the restaurant, the Priest tells her he is always available to talk.

As Fleabag is walking home, Claire calls to her from a nearby cab, which Fleabag gets inside. Fleabag directs the taxi to the nearest hospital. Claire and Fleabag reconcile by commenting on the fact that the Priest is attractive.

Cast 
 Phoebe Waller-Bridge as Fleabag
 Sian Clifford as Claire
 Andrew Scott as The Priest 
 Bill Paterson as Dad
 Olivia Colman as Fleabag's godmother
 Brett Gelman as Martin

Guest stars 
 Maddie Rice as Needy Waitress

Production 
Waller-Bridge, who is the sole series writer, intended to have an episode set in a restaurant because the single setting felt theatrical. Initially meant to be episode three, Waller-Bridge cut those episodes and instead made "Episode 1" the premiere.

Bradbeer, with whom Waller-Bridge consulted closely on the show's writing, decided to keep the camera in one spot during the dinner table scenes. "Episode 1" was edited by series editor Gary Dollner. The three experimented with removing Waller-Bridge's direct addresses to the camera but decided that this element was needed.

Broadcast
Every episode in series 2 was released on 17 May 2019 on Amazon Prime Video.

Reception 
"Episode 1" received critical acclaim. Reviewer Danette Chavez wrote for The A.V. Club, "The premiere is an early frontrunner for best episode of the season, if not the series, returning to Fleabag’s theatrical roots for an evening of farce and concentrated viciousness. With the help of series director Harry Bradbeer, Waller-Bridge stages a dinner party for the ages, one that's both a comedy of manners and the introductory chapter to a love story."

For the episode, Waller-Bridge received a Primetime Emmy Award for Outstanding Writing for a Comedy Series and Outstanding Lead Actress in a Comedy Series, and Bradbeer received a Primetime Emmy for Outstanding Directing for a Comedy Series at the 71st Primetime Emmys.

At the Creative Primetime Emmy Awards, the episode's editor, Gary Dollner received a Creative Primetime Emmy for Outstanding Single-Camera Picture Editing for a Comedy Series, and the cinematographer, Tony Miller, received a nomination for the Outstanding Cinematography for a Single-Camera Series (Half-Hour).

References

External links 
"Episode 1" on IMDb

2019 British television episodes
Television episodes set in London
Emmy Award-winning episodes